is a Fukui Railway Fukubu Line railway station located in the city of Echizen, Fukui Prefecture, Japan.

Lines

Station layout
The station consists of one ground-level side platform serving a single bi-directional track. The station is unattended.

Adjacent stations

History
The station opened on March 25, 2010.

Surrounding area
Iehisa Sports Park
Fukui Prefectural Road 212

See also
 List of railway stations in Japan

External links

  

Railway stations in Fukui Prefecture
Railway stations in Japan opened in 2010
Fukui Railway Fukubu Line
Echizen, Fukui